Jovo Damjanović (born 24 December 1996) is a Montenegrin-born Qatari handball player for Al Rayyan and Qatar.

Club career
In October 2011, at age 14, Damjanović made his senior debut for Sutjeska Nikšić. He spent two seasons with the club before signing with Qatari team El Jaish in May 2013. In August 2017, Damjanović returned to Europe and signed with Paris Saint-Germain on a two-year contract.

International career
A former Montenegro youth international, Damjanović represented Qatar at the 2015 World Championship, as the team finished as runners-up. He also participated at the 2017 World Under-21 Championship.

Honours
El Jaish
 Asian Club League Handball Championship: 2014
Paris Saint-Germain
 LNH Division 1: 2017–18

References

External links

 LNH record
 

1996 births
Living people
Sportspeople from Nikšić
Naturalised citizens of Qatar
Qatari people of Montenegrin descent
Montenegrin male handball players
Qatari male handball players
Handball players at the 2014 Summer Youth Olympics
Expatriate handball players
Montenegrin expatriate sportspeople in Qatar
Montenegrin expatriate sportspeople in France
Montenegrin expatriate sportspeople in Serbia